Joliet Union Station was a train station in Joliet, Illinois that served  Amtrak long-distance and Metra commuter trains. It was replaced by the new Joliet Transportation Center in 2018, a train station that was constructed adjacent to the Union Station's location. Train service to Joliet Union Station permanently ceased in September 2014.

Service
When it was in active service, Joliet Union Station was at the junction of the former Rock Island Line, Atchison, Topeka, and Santa Fe, and Alton Railroad main lines. Therefore, it has two different milepost numbers depending on how far each route is to Chicago.

The Rock Island line runs via Blue Island, Illinois to LaSalle Street Station (track owned by Metra), while the Metra Heritage Corridor line runs via Summit, Illinois to Chicago's Union Station (track owned by Canadian National). The Blue Island trains leave from a single track on the south side of the station, while four tracks on the east side serve Amtrak, Metra Heritage, BNSF freight, and Union Pacific freight trains (BNSF owns the western two tracks, while UP owns the eastern two). CSX takes over ownership of the Rock Island tracks just west of the station, with trackage rights from the Iowa Interstate Railroad.

Five Amtrak trains on the Chicago – St. Louis corridor stop in Joliet daily each way: the Texas Eagle and the Lincoln Service. This was also a stop for the Ann Rutledge until April 2007.

History
Train service to Joliet was begun by the Chicago and Rock Island Railroad, a predecessor of the Rock Island Line, in 1852.  Joliet Union Station was designed by architect Jarvis Hunt in the Beaux Arts Classical style, and was built in 1912. The City of Joliet owns two thirds of the station and Metra owns the other third. The former waiting room has been converted to a banquet hall that can hold 350 guests.

This station used to serve the Southwest Chief until the BNSF merger in 1996 when Amtrak rerouted the Southwest Chief over BNSF track to Galesburg. Joliet Union Station is the site of the old Rock Island Line diamond.

When originally built, there were pedestrian tunnels between the terminal and a platform between the first and second track on both the south and east sides of the building. Canopies also covered those platforms.  However, the tunnels were later closed and the canopies removed.  Finally passenger service on the east side of the building was moved to the third and fourth rails, requiring passengers to cross over the freight tracks to access the trains. Later the number of Rock Island tracks on the south side of the building was reduced from four to one.

Joliet Union Station was listed on the National Register of Historic Places on August 1, 1978. The station was extensively renovated and made ADA-accessible in 1989–1991. Eastbound U.S. Highway 30, the Lincoln Highway, passes by Joliet Union Station.

Replacement
The state government of Illinois announced, on October 28, 2010, a $42 million long-term plan to replace Joliet Union Station and partly rebuild the tracks.  Separate tracks, dedicated solely to freight traffic, will be laid for BNSF container stacktrains.  Rail passengers will be rerouted into a new multimodal train and bus station. $32 million came from "Illinois Jobs Now!", a six-year, $31 billion statewide capital program supported by 20 year state bonds and federal and local matching funds. The BNSF Railway also pledged $2.2 million and the city contributed $7.5 million. The existing Union Station building will remain, but a new terminal was built beside it.  New tunnels provide Metra access to the Heritage Corridor Line trains, eliminating the need to cross the BNSF freight tracks.  The project includes a new 500-car parking garage. The new transportation center opened on April 11, 2018.

Currently Metra controls the interlocking tower at the junction of the Rock Island and BNSF tracks.  As a result, Metra makes freight trains stop in order to give Metra passenger trains priority.  Under the grant, control of the interlock would be shifted to the BNSF and Union Pacific and the tower building itself will be preserved. The Metra Rock Island passenger platform would be moved across the diamond to the east side of the BNSF tracks to avoid conflict with the flow of freight trains.

Bus connections
Pace
501
504
505
507
508
509
511
832
834

References

External links 

Official Website
Joliet Amtrak station information

Joliet Amtrak Station (USA Rail Guide – Train Web)
Will County Listings at the National Register of Historic Places
Joliet Union Station (Metra)
Rock Island
Heritage Corridor
Flickr Photo
Image from Dynamic Depot Maps.com
Joliet Union Station (Blackhawk Chapter NRHS)
Station building from Google Maps Street View
Scott Street entrance from Google Maps Street View
Chicago Street entrance from Google Maps Street View
Van Buren Street entrance from Google Maps Street View
Joliet (JOL)--Great American Stations (Amtrak)

	

Former Amtrak stations in Illinois
Metra stations in Illinois
Joliet
Buildings and structures in Joliet, Illinois
Transportation in Joliet, Illinois
Transit centers in the United States
History of Joliet, Illinois
Railway stations in the United States opened in 1912
National Register of Historic Places in Will County, Illinois
Railway stations on the National Register of Historic Places in Illinois
Joliet
Joliet Union Station
Joliet
1912 establishments in Illinois
Beaux-Arts architecture in Illinois
Railway stations closed in 2014
2014 disestablishments in Illinois